Chitrapur Saraswats are a small Konkani-speaking community of Hindu Brahmins in India. They are traditionally found along the Kanara coast and call themselves Bhanaps in the Konkani language.

This is a small community from India spread the world over. They have taken names of villages in Karnataka as surnames. So, their recent history is associated with the State of Karnataka. But some researchers like Bertrand Renaud and Frank Conlon believe they migrated from the banks of River Saraswati in north India. The estimated population of this community is roughly 25,000. The community members refer to themselves as "Bhanaps". The community also has a magazine published every month called Kanara Saraswat from Mumbai which carries articles by members and other news concerning the community.

Origin
Historian Susan Bayly states that the Ramanandis, who opened up to almost any background were responsible for "Brahmanising" groups of unclear status and Chitrapur Saraswats are one such example. Specifically, she states,

Notable people
Benegal Narsing Rau, Indian civil servant, jurist, diplomat and statesman known for his key role in drafting the Constitution of India
Narayan Ganesh Chandavarkar, Indian National Congress politician and Hindu reformer.
Amrita Rao, Bollywood actress

Guru Dutt, Indian film director, producer and actor.
Shyam Benegal, Indian film director and screenwriter 
Karnad Sadashiva Rao, Indian freedom fighter
Girish Karnad, Indian actor, film director, Kannada-language writer

See also
 Canara Konkani
 Saraswat cuisine

References

External links
 Kanara Saraswat Association official Website
 Chitrapur Math, Shirali
 Chitrapurebooks.com 

Konkani
Mangalorean society
Brahmin communities of Karnataka
Brahmin communities of Goa